The  Pico mango (also spelled piko), also known as padero, is a variety of mango from the Philippines. Along with the Carabao mango, it is among the most commonly commercially cultivated mango cultivar in the Philippines.

It is distinctly flattened in comparison to the Carabao mango. Ripe fruits are pale yellow to light orange in color. The flesh of ripe fruits is sweet, colored rich orange that usually turn reddish near the tips. The flesh is soft but not as soft as Carabao mangoes.

Like other Southeast Asian-type mangoes, Pico mangoes are polyembryonic, in contrast to Indian-type mangoes. The fruiting season is from May to July.

See also 
Carabao mango
Pahutan mango
Mangga wani (Mangifera caesia) - also known as Bayuno; another species of mango native to the Philippines.

References

Mango cultivars